Başpınar is a village in the Araban District, Gaziantep Province, Turkey. The village is populated by Kurds.

References

Villages in Araban District
Kurdish settlements in Gaziantep Province